The Tibet Bureau in Paris, one of the offices of the official representation of the 14th Dalai Lama and of the Tibetan government in exile, is in charge of France, the Iberian Peninsula, the Maghreb and the Benelux countries (except Belgium). Founded in September 1992 it acts as an Embassy.

Activities 

The Bureau is responsible for the preparation of visits of the Dalai Lama and of officials of the government in exile to promote  culture, religion and Tibetan language, to support the Tibetans living in Europe and Maghreb, and promote the cause of Tibet internationally.

Shortly after the founding of the Tibet Bureau in Paris in September 1992, François Mitterrand, then president of the French Republic, received the Dalai Lama in private at the Elysee on 16 November 1993.

Every year, the Tibet Bureau organizes the celebration of the birthday of the Dalai Lama.

Since 1996, the Tibet Bureau publishes Actualités Tibétaines, a quarterly magazine.

On October 20, 2003, the Dalai Lama is received at the Paris City Hall by Bertrand Delanoë, then mayor of Paris.

List of representatives

 Dawa Thondup : September 1992 – 1997
 Kunzang Yuthok : February 1997 – 2001
 Tashi Phuntsok : September 2001 - November 2005
 Jampal Chosang : 27 February 2006 – 2009
 Tashi Wangdi : January 2009 -17 December 2010
 Ngodup Dorjee : December 17, 2010  -2014
 Tseten Samdup Chhoekyapa : 1 October 2014-

List of Secretaries 
In 1993, Wangpo Bashi joined the Tibet Bureau in Paris, and was appointed secretary of the Tibetan government in exile in 1995. He was replaced on 25 August 2011 by Tsering Dhondup.

References
https://tibet.net/namgyal-samdup-takes-on-as-new-coordinator-of-office-of-tibet-paris/

External links
Official website

Offices of Tibet
Central Tibetan Administration
Organizations based in Paris
Organizations established in 1992
Tibet